Munyati (formerly Umniati) is an estate in Midlands province in Zimbabwe owned by the Zimbabwe Power Company (a subsidiary of ZESA) . In 1938, a coal-fired power station was built in the area and the village was established to house the personnel. It also has a few shops for regular shopping, a primary and secondary (high) school and a football team called Tigers. Gold, copper, stibnite and tungsten are mined in the area. Munyati happens to be the name of a river in this region.

Education 
Munyati has educational facilities for its community members.

Schools
As a small estate, Munyati offers three stages of education which are Preschool, Primary School and High School. The educational facilities in Munyati are named Munyati Pre-School, Munyati Primary School and Munyati High School . Locally, over 500 children/students are enrolled every year. Some come from near cities, "Kwekwe" and Villages.

See also 
 Munyati River

References 

Populated places in Midlands Province